Apocalypse: The Second World War (French: Apocalypse, la 2e Guerre mondiale) (2009) is a six-part French documentary by Daniel Costelle and Isabelle Clarke about the Second World War. The music of the documentary was composed by Kenji Kawai.

The documentary is composed exclusively of actual footage of the war as filmed by war correspondents, soldiers, resistance fighters and private citizens. The series is shown in color, with the black-and-white footage being fully colorized, save for some original color footage. The only exception to the treatment are most Holocaust scenes, which are presented in the original black and white.

It was first aired in 2009 from August 20 and 27 and September 3 on the French-speaking Belgian RTBF then on August 23 and 30 and September 6 on the French-speaking Swiss TSR and finally on September 8 to September 22 on France 2 channel. It was narrated in French by actor/director Mathieu Kassovitz. The documentary was shown on the Smithsonian Channel in the United States, where it was narrated by actor Martin Sheen, on the National Geographic Channel and Channel 4 in the United Kingdom, where it was narrated by actor Jonathan Booth, Canada, the Netherlands, Poland, Australia, Romania and Asia, on YLE Teema in Finland, on Rete 4 in Italy, on IBA, the national public channel in Israel, on RTP2, the national public channel in Portugal, and on La 2, the national public channel in Spain.

Episodes 
 Aggression (1933–1939): rise of Nazism and the invasion of Poland, Phoney war
 Crushing Defeat (1939–1940): Battle of Dunkirk and Battle of France, Battle of Britain
 Shock (1940–1941): the North African Campaign, Invasion of Yugoslavia, Battle of Greece and Battle of Crete, Operation Barbarossa, Battle of Smolensk and Battle of Moscow
 World Ablaze (1941–1942): Pearl Harbor, Midway and Guadalcanal, Operation Fall Blau 
 The Great Landings/The Noose (1942–1943): first failures of the Axis, Battle of Stalingrad, El Alamein, Operation Torch, Tunisia, Kursk and Italian campaign 
 Inferno (1944–1945): liberation of France, invasion of Germany, surrender of Germany, atomic bombing of Hiroshima and Nagasaki, and surrender of Japan

Depictions 
The documentary includes a series of portraits of the main leaders of World War II.

Germans 
 Adolf Hitler
 Hermann Göring
 Konstantin von Neurath
 Joachim von Ribbentrop
 Rudolf Hess
 Joseph Goebbels
 Martin Bormann
 Heinrich Himmler
 Reinhard Heydrich
 Albert Speer
 Eva Braun
 Magda Goebbels
 Karl Dönitz
 Wilhelm Keitel
 Fedor von Bock
 Heinz Guderian
 Friedrich Paulus
 Erwin Rommel
 Erich von Manstein
 Walther von Brauchitsch

French 
 Charles de Gaulle
 Philippe Leclerc de Hauteclocque
 Philippe Pétain
 Paul Reynaud
 Maurice Gamelin
 Maxime Weygand
 Henri Giraud
 Albert Lebrun
 Jean de Lattre de Tassigny
 Charles Huntziger
 Émile Muselier

British 
 Neville Chamberlain
 Winston Churchill
 Bernard Montgomery
 Arthur Harris

Americans 
 Franklin D. Roosevelt
 Dwight Eisenhower
 Douglas MacArthur
 Chester Nimitz
 George Patton
 Charles A. Lindbergh
 Henry Ford
 Joseph P. Kennedy
 John F. Kennedy
 Harry S. Truman

Soviets 
 Joseph Stalin
 Vyacheslav Molotov
 Georgy Zhukov
 Lavrentiy Beria
 Semyon Timoshenko
 Nikita Khrushchev
 Andrey Vlasov

Italians 
 Benito Mussolini
 Galeazzo Ciano

Japanese 
 Hirohito
 Hideki Tōjō
 Tomoyuki Yamashita
 Isoroku Yamamoto

Chinese 
 Chiang Kai-shek

Miscellaneous 
Some of the people documented in the series:
 Rose Gowlland – A British child who was a year old when the war broke out.
 Gaston Sirec – A French truck driver who was imprisoned in a stalag when the Germans defeated France.
 Lt. August Graf Kageneck – A German Tank commander who personifies a typical Wehrmacht soldier as he writes in his journal or to his mother.
 While a lot of males are mentioned in this documentary series, cell block guards and nurses who were female also contributed to WWII. A novel by Elizabeth Wein displays some of this torment done in women concentration camps.

See also
 Apocalypse: World War I
 Apocalypse: Hitler
 Apocalypse: Stalin
 Apocalypse: Verdun
 Apocalypse: Never-Ending War 1918-1926
 Apocalypse: the Cold War
 Apocalypse: Hitler Takes on the West
 Apocalypse: Hitler Takes on the East

References

External links
Apocalypse on TSR

French documentary television series
2009 French television series debuts
2009 French television series endings
Documentary television series about World War II